Lepiota brunneolilacea, also known as the star dapperling, is a gilled mushroom of the genus Lepiota in the order Agaricales. It is known to contain deadly amounts of alpha-Amanitin, and was responsible for a fatal poisoning.

See also
 List of deadly fungi
 List of Lepiota species

References

brunneolilacea
Deadly fungi
Fungi of Europe
Fungi of North America
Fungi described in 1972